Intuition is a phenomenon of the mind described as the ability to acquire knowledge without inference or the use of reason

Intuition may also refer to:

Music
Intuition (rapper) (born 1981), American rapper

Albums
Intuition (Angela Bofill album)
Intuition (Bill Evans album)
Intuition (DJ Encore album)
Intuition (Jamie Foxx album)
Intuition (Linx album)
Intuition (TNT album)
Intuition (Wallace Roney album)

Songs
"Intuition" (free improvisation), a 1949 recording by Lennie Tristano's quintet
"Intuition" (Linx song), 1981
"Intuition" (Jewel song), 2003
"Intuition", a song by John Lennon from the album Mind Games, 1973
"Intuition", a song by Natalie Imbruglia from the album Left of the Middle, 1997
"Intuition", a song by Selena Gomez & the Scene from the album A Year Without Rain, 2010
"Intuition", a song by CN Blue from the album First Step, 2011
"Intuition", a song by Reks from The Greatest X, 2016
"Intuition", a song by Northlane from the album Mesmer, 2017

Other uses
Intuition (MBTI), one of the four axes of the Myers-Briggs Type Indicator
Intuition (Amiga), a graphical user interface toolkit supplied with the Commodore Amiga computer
Intuition (Bergson), the philosophical method of Henri Bergson
Intuition Peak, a geographical feature in Antarctica
Intuition (film), an Argentinian crime thriller film
Intuition (novel), by Allegra Goodman
Intuition in the philosophy of Herman Dooyeweerd